Spencer William Brown (18 October 1921 – c. 1973) was a rugby union player who represented Australia.

Brown, a fly-half, was born in Atherton, Queensland and claimed a total of 3 international rugby caps for Australia.

References

Australian rugby union players
Australia international rugby union players
1921 births
1970s deaths
Rugby union players from Queensland
Rugby union fly-halves